Canty is a surname. Notable people with the surname include:

Anthony Canty (born 1991), German basketball player
Brendan Canty (born 1966), American drummer for the band Fugazi
Chris Canty (defensive lineman) (born 1982), American football defensive end in the National Football League 
Chris Canty (defensive back) (born 1976), American football defensive back in the Arena Football League
Dominique Canty (born 1977), American professional women's basketball player 
Graham Canty (born 1980), Irish footballer
James Canty, American musician
James M. Canty (1865–1964), American educator, school administrator, and businessperson
John G. Canty (1917–1992), American thoroughbred horse racing trainer 
Kevin Canty (author) (born 1953), American author and academic
Kevin Canty (hurler) (born 1986), Irish hurler
Marcus Canty (born 1991), American R&B and soul singer
Mary Agnes Canty (1879–1950), New Zealand teacher, catholic nun, and nursing school matron 
Thomas Canty (born 1952), illustrator and book designer 
Thomas Canty (judge) (1854-1920), American jurist

See also
Canti (surname)